Devario apogon is a fish from the Yunnan province of China which is not dissimilar to Devario shanensis. The fish appears to grow to a maximum of 5–6 cm and is found in the Irrawaddy drainage in Yunnan, China.

References

External links
 Devario apogon

Devario
Cyprinid fish of Asia
Fauna of Southeast Asia
Fish of China
Fish described in 1981